The 2017 WNBA Finals was the best-of-five championship series for the 2017 season of the Women's National Basketball Association (WNBA), tipping off on September 24. It was a rematch of the previous year's finals matchup. The top-seeded Minnesota Lynx held home court advantage in the Finals, and won three games to two against the second-seeded Los Angeles Sparks. The Sparks won a semifinal series against the Phoenix Mercury to determine one of the Finals berths; the first-seeded Lynx defeated the Washington Mystics to earn the other. Sylvia Fowles was named the 2017 WNBA Finals MVP.

Road to the Finals

Standings and playoffs

Series summary
All times are in Eastern Daylight Time (UTC−4).

Game 1

Game 2

Game 3

Game 4

Game 5

References

2017
2017 WNBA season
Los Angeles Sparks
Minnesota Lynx
2017 in sports in Minnesota
2017 in sports in California
Basketball competitions in Minneapolis
Basketball competitions in Los Angeles
2017 in Los Angeles
2010s in Minneapolis
WNBA Finals
WNBA Finals